The 2012 ITU World Triathlon Series was a series of eight World Championship Triathlon events that led up to a Grand Final held in Auckland, New Zealand in October 2012. The Series was organised under the auspices of the world governing body of triathlon, the International Triathlon Union (ITU).

The World Triathlon Series (WTS) visited Sydney, San Diego, Madrid, Kitzbühel, Hamburg, London, Stockholm, and Auckland. The series took place during the 2012 Summer Olympic year with many countries using the results of some series races to determine which athletes would qualify to represent their nation in triathlon at the 2012 Summer Olympics.

The series included two sprint distance races and six Olympic distance races. The series stop in Stockholm also served as the location for the 2012 ITU Team Triathlon World Championships. The Grand Final in Auckland included the World Championships for Under 23, Junior and Paratriathlon division, which was decided over a single race. Elite level competitors were crowned champions in Auckland based on the final WTS point standings.

Calendar
The 2012 series visited eight cities around the world.

Results

Medal summary

Men

Women

Overall

Men

Women

References

2012
World Triathlon Series
2012 in New Zealand sport
Sport in Auckland
International sports competitions hosted by New Zealand
Triathlon competitions in New Zealand